This is a list of high schools in the U.S. state of West Virginia.

Locations are the communities in which they are located, with postal location in parentheses if different.

Barbour County
Philip Barbour High School, Philippi

Berkeley County

Hedgesville High School, Hedgesville
Musselman High School, Inwood

Martinsburg

Faith Christian Academy
Martinsburg High School
Spring Mills High School

Boone County

Scott High School, Madison
Sherman High School, Seth
Van Junior-Senior High School, Van

Braxton County
Braxton County High School, Flatwoods

Brooke County
Brooke High School, Wellsburg

Cabell County
Cabell Midland High School, Ona

Huntington

Covenant School
Grace Christian School
Huntington High School
Huntington Prep School
St. Joseph Central Catholic High School

Calhoun County
Calhoun County Middle-High School, Mount Zion
Calhoun Gilmer Center

Clay County
Clay County High School, Clay

Doddridge County
Doddridge County High School, West Union

Fayette County

Meadow Bridge High School, Meadow Bridge
Midland Trail High School, Hico

Oak Hill

Fayette Institute of Technology
Oak Hill High School

Gilmer County
Gilmer County High School, Glenville

Grant County
Union K-12 Educational Complex, Mount Storm

Petersburg

Petersburg High School
South Branch Vocational Center

Greenbrier County

Greenbrier East High School, Fairlea
Greenbrier West High School, Charmco

Hampshire County

Romney

Hampshire County Career Center
Hampshire High School
West Virginia School for the Blind
West Virginia School for the Deaf

Hancock County

New Cumberland

John D. Rockefeller Career Center
Oak Glen High School

Weirton

Weir High School
Weirton Madonna High School

Hardy County

East Hardy High School, Baker
Moorefield High School, Moorefield

Harrison County

Bridgeport High School, Bridgeport
Lincoln High School, Shinnston
South Harrison High School, Lost Creek

Clarksburg

Notre Dame High School
Robert C. Byrd High School
Liberty High School
United Technical Center

Jackson County

Ravenswood High School, Ravenswood
Ripley High School, Ripley
Roane-Jackson Technical Center, LeRoy

Jefferson County

Jefferson High School, Shenandoah Junction
Washington High School, Charles Town

Kanawha County

Ben Franklin Career & Technical/Vocational Center, Dunbar
Carver Career & Technical Education Center, Rand
Elk Valley Christian School, Elkview
Herbert Hoover High School, Falling Rock
Nitro High School, Nitro
Riverside High School, Quincy
St. Albans High School, St. Albans
Sissonville High School, Pocatalico
South Charleston High School, South Charleston

Charleston

Capital High School
Chandler Academy Alternative School
Charleston Catholic High School
Cross Lanes Christian School
Garnet Career Center
George Washington High School

Lewis County
Lewis County High School, Weston

Lincoln County
Lincoln County High School, Hamlin

Logan County

Chapmanville Regional High School, Chapmanville
Man High School, Man

Logan

Logan High School
Ralph R Willis Vocational Center

Marion County

Fairmont

East Fairmont High School
Fairmont Senior High School

Farmington

Marion County Technical Center
North Marion High School

Marshall County

Cameron High School, Cameron
John Marshall High School, Glen Dale

Mason County

Hannan High School, Ashton
Wahama High School, Mason

Point Pleasant

Mason County Vocational-Technical Center
Point Pleasant High School

McDowell County
River View High School, Bradshaw

Welch

McDowell County Career and Technology Center
Mount View High School

Mercer County

Bluefield High School, Bluefield
Montcalm High School, Montcalm
PikeView High School, Athens

Princeton

Mercer Christian Academy
Princeton High School, Princeton

Mineral County

Frankfort High School, Short Gap
Keyser High School, Keyser

Mingo County

Mingo Central High School, Newtown
Tug Valley High School, Naugatuck

Monongalia County
Clay-Battelle High School, Blacksville

Morgantown

Morgantown High School
Trinity Christian School
University High School
Monongalia County Technical Education Center
Morgantown Christian Academy

Monroe County

Lindside

James Monroe High School
Monroe County Vocational/Technical Center

Morgan County

Berkeley Springs High School, Berkeley Springs
Paw Paw High School, Paw Paw

Nicholas County

Nicholas County Career and Technical Center, Craigsville
Richwood High School, Richwood

Summersville

New Life Christian Academy
Nicholas County High School

Ohio County

Wheeling

Linsly School
Wheeling Central Catholic High School
Wheeling Park High School

Pendleton County
Pendleton County High School, Franklin

Pleasants County

St. Marys

Mid-Ohio Valley Technical Institute (serves Pleasants, Ritchie, Tyler, & Wetzel Counties)
St. Marys High School

Pocahontas County
Pocahontas County High School, Dunmore

Preston County
Preston High School, Kingwood

Putnam County

Buffalo High School, Buffalo
Hurricane High School, Hurricane
Poca High School, Poca
Teays Valley Christian School, Scott Depot
Winfield High School, Winfield

Raleigh County 

 Greater Beckley Christian School, Prosperity
 Independence High School, Coal City
 Liberty High School, Glen Daniel
 Shady Spring High School, Shady Spring

Beckley

 Academy of Careers and Technology
 Woodrow Wilson High School

Randolph County

Harman High School, Harman
Pickens K-12 School, Pickens
Tygarts Valley High School, Mill Creek

Elkins

Elkins High School
Randolph Technical Center

Ritchie County

Ellenboro

The Highland School
Ritchie County High School

Roane County
Roane County High School, Spencer

Summers County
Summers County High School, Hinton

Taylor County
Grafton High School, Grafton

Tucker County
Tucker County High School, Hambleton

Tyler County
Tyler Consolidated High School, Sistersville

Upshur County
Buckhannon-Upshur High School, Buckhannon
Fred W. Eberle Technical Center

Wayne County

Spring Valley High School, Huntington
Tolsia High School and Southern Vocational/Technology Center, Fort Gay
Wayne High School, Wayne

Webster County
Webster County High School, Upperglade

Wetzel County

Hundred High School, Hundred
Magnolia High School, New Martinsville
Paden City High School, Paden City
Valley High School, Pine Grove

Wirt County
Wirt County High School, Elizabeth

Wood County

Parkersburg

Parkersburg Catholic High School
Parkersburg Christian School
Parkersburg High School
Parkersburg South High School

Williamstown

Williamstown High School
Wood County Christian School

Wyoming County

Westside High School, Clear Fork
Wyoming East High School, New Richmond

See also
Education in West Virginia
List of school districts in West Virginia

External links
List of high schools in West Virginia from SchoolTree.org

West Virginia
High Schools in West Virginia, List of